Cistus sintenisii is a shrubby species of flowering plant in the family Cistaceae. It was named in honor of Paul Sintenis.

Phylogeny
Cistus sintenisii belongs to the white and whitish pink flowered clade of Cistus species.

References

sintenisii